Handel Gothic is a geometric sans-serif typeface designed in 1965 by Donald J. Handel (1936–2002), who worked for the graphic designer Saul Bass.  

Handel Gothic was an instant success when first released. The typeface was originally distributed in film format by FotoStar and was reissued in the 1980s by Robert Trogman.

The typeface was popular in the 1980s, due to its futuristic design, and even today is used to signify the future; it has been used in the credits of both Star Trek: Voyager and Star Trek: Deep Space Nine as well as the logo for Close Encounters of the Third Kind and the menu text for the 2000 Nintendo 64 game Perfect Dark.

Handel Gothic was also used for the end credits on CBS's The Price Is Right from 1972 to 1981. Handel Gothic was also used for the end credits of Sesame Street (1983-1992).

The Elsner+Flake, Linotype and URW++ versions use a curved leg on uppercase R (like that of Helvetica), a horizontal tail on the uppercase Q (like that of Univers), a curved lower leg on the lowercase k, and a trident-like lowercase w.

The Bitstream and Tilde SIA versions, however, use a thicker 1, a straight leg on the uppercase R (like that of Akzidenz-Grotesk), a straight lower leg on the lowercase k, and a double-v w.

Christian Schwartz designed the Simian Display typeface, inspired from the Handel Gothic typeface, with OpenType features.

Handel Gothic Cyrillic
It is a version by Tilde SIA with Cyrillic support. The family includes 1 font.

ITC Handel Gothic (2008)
It is a re-proportioned version designed by Rod McDonald, released in March 2008 by International Typeface Corporation.

The original release includes 5 fonts in 5 weights. OpenType features include fractions, ligatures, ordinals, stylistic alternates and subscript/superscript. Italic versions of the fonts were introduced with release of ITC Handel Gothic Pro.

ITC Handel Gothic Pro (2010)
It is a version of ITC Handel Gothic with complementary italic designs, support of Adobe Central Europe character set, addition of ligatures and alternate characters.

Additional OpenType features include localized forms, stylistic set 1.

ITC Handel Gothic Arabic (2015)
It is a version of ITC Handel Gothic for Arabic, Persian and Urdu languages, designed by Nadine Chahine of Monotype Imaging, based on Kufic script.

The font family includes 5 fonts in 5 weights, without italics.

URW++ Handel Slab (2009)
A slab-serif counterpart to URW++ Handel Gothic with three weights (Light, Medium, Bold) and obliques styles to complement them.

Corporate identity uses
343 Industries, the current developer of the Halo video game franchise, have used Handel Gothic in their logo since their first game, Halo: Combat Evolved Anniversary, released in 2011. This follows the font being used in the first game in the Halo series, Halo: Combat Evolved (in menus in-game, and in the game's instruction manual), which was developed by Bungie and released in 2001.
ADFC – Allgemeiner Deutscher Fahrrad-Club, the German NGO, supporting cycling, uses Handel Gothic as their corporate logo font.
American Motors / AMC Eagle car model emblem from 1980 until 1987, used for the name of the car model EAGLE.
Arkon Technologies – Handel Gothic Light
Basic/Four Corporation
Canon EOS autofocus photographic cameras line emblem since 1987, used for the name of the camera line EOS.
CentOS, a Linux distribution, uses Handel Gothic in its logo.
Cinemax Studios (now GMA Pictures) Used the font in 1997 until June 24, 1998
Nvidia, logo font Handel Gothic, logo since 2006. 
Disney – The Walt Disney Company used Handel Gothic in the logo of The Disney Channel from 1983 to 1986. The font was also used on the Walt Disney Home Video logo Neon Mickey from 1983 to 1986 and the clamshells from Walt Disney Home Video usually from 1980 to early 1984. Additionally, it was featured on the 1971 to 1996 Walt Disney World logo with a Mickey silhouette within an oversized "D", as well as on signage within EPCOT Center prior to refurbishments.
The Hoover Company - Used on its vacuum cleaners in the 1990s
id Software's 2010 video game Quake Live uses Handel Gothic in its user interface.
Robotnik Automation – uses Handel Gothic in their logo.
Korean Broadcasting System- Korean national public television broadcaster's logo.
Mega (Chilean TV channel) – used Handel Gothic for its news division in the early 2000s. Additionally, his newscast program Meganoticias used Handel Gothic in their logo from 2000 until 2010.
Metro TV (Indonesia) Used this font in logo since 2010.
Pepsi logos from 1987 to 2003 featured this font.
 PHP, a general-purpose scripting language, uses Handel Gothic in its logo.
San Miguel Corporation uses Handel Gothic as their corporate logo font since 1975.
News Patrol, a newscast in the ABS-CBN News Philippines, used this logo font since 2008.
TV Patrol, a newscast in the Philippines, used this font since 2001.
Huawei, logo font Handel Gothic, logo 2006 to 2018. 
United Airlines – In 1973 Saul Bass developed the United logo that featured a customized red and blue "Double U" logo and underneath Handel Gothic logotype.
Univision – Has used the font for its graphics packages during the early 2000s.
Volvo – has used the font since 1974.  Initially, it was used for the model badges on its cars, but this application ceased in the early 1980s when it began to be used for the instrument panel and dashboard graphics, where it has been applied ever since.
WWF SmackDown! used it for the first two years of the show, as the nameplate font for wrestlers, commentators and other various graphics from 1999 to 2001.
ZDF (Zweites Deutsches Fernsehen) – German national public television broadcaster's logo.

References

External links
Handel Gothic Font Family – by Ronald Trogram
Handel Gothic by URW
MyFonts: Handel Gothic
Handel Gothic, Handel Gothic Cyrillic

ITC Handel Gothic
ITC Handel Gothic font family
ITC Handel Gothic Arabic font family
What's New From ITC: March 2008
What's Hot From ITC: March 2010

Typefaces and fonts introduced in the 1960s
Geometric sans-serif typefaces